Farzad Mousakhani (Persian:  فرزاد موسی خانی) (born 1981) is an Iranian strongman competing for Iran in international strongman competitions.

He participated three times in Iran's Strongest Man finishing in 2nd place in 2007.

Personal Records
Squat: 
Bench Press: 
Deadlift for max weight: 
Deadlift for reps:  for 7 repetitions
Log Lift for max weight: 
Log Lift for reps:  for 9 repetitions in 60 seconds
Yoke Race with : 20 meters in 9.20 seconds
Yoke Race with : 20 meters in 16.80 seconds
Atlas Stones: , 4 repetitions, 140 centimeters high platform

See also
Iran's Strongest Man
World Strongman Cup Federation

References

External links
Strongman Champions League, 2008 
Persian Gulf World Strongman Cup, 2007
WORLD’S TOP STRONGMEN LIFT A LOG MADE OF THE LAVIAN PINE TREE

1981 births
Living people
Iranian powerlifters
Iranian strength athletes